is a Japanse animator and art director. He co-created the 1997 television anime series Revolutionary Girl Utena and its 1999 film sequel Adolescence of Utena as a member of the production group Be-Papas. He also worked as an animation director on the 1995 television anime series Neon Genesis Evangelion.

References

External links
 Shinya Hasegawa on Twitter
 
 

1968 births
Japanese animators
Living people